Jon Naismith (born 1965) is a producer mainly known for his work on BBC Radio, primarily comedy, including You'll Have Had Your Tea, The Unbelievable Truth and About a Dog.

Since 1991 he has been the producer of I'm Sorry I Haven't a Clue.

Early life 
Jon Naismith attended Horris Hill School in Hampshire from 1973 to 1978.

Naismith was a member of Footlights at the University of Cambridge and Junior Treasurer from 1987–1988. He co-wrote and starred in the 1988 revue Sheep Go Bare alongside Mel Giedroyc, Simon Munnery, Tom Hollander, Dan Gooch and Sarah Dudman.

Work 
Naismith has been producer of the long-running radio panel show I'm Sorry I Haven't a Clue since 1991. The episodes are recorded before a live theatre audience, with two programmes being recorded at each performance and Naismith traditionally performs the duties of "warmup artist". This usually involves testing sound recording levels by means of a "patronising audience participation exercise" and a joke. Naismith also provides the voiceovers for the show, such as when the host talks about something appearing on the laser display board, he is "the mystery voice for listeners at home".

Personal life
He married Belinda Campbell in Oxfordshire in June 2002.

Books 
 The Little Book of Mornington Crescent. 2000. 
 with Graeme Garden and Barry Cryer: Hamish and Dougal: You'll Have Had Your Tea?. 2005. 
 Uxbridge English Dictionary (I'm Sorry I Haven't a Clue). 2005.

References

External links

1965 births
Alumni of the University of Cambridge
BBC radio producers
British radio producers
Living people